Nick Hækkerup (born 3 April 1968 in Fredensborg) is a Danish writer and politician of Social Democrats who has been serving as the Minister of Justice in the Frederiksen Cabinet from 2019 to 2022. He previously served as Minister of Defence, and Minister of Health.

He has also written a number of books about the politics of the European Union, and on Danish politics.

Political career

Career in local politics
Hækkerup was elected into the municipal council of the former Hillerød Municipality in the 1993 Danish local elections. He sat in the municipality's municipal council from 1994 and until the municipality was merged with Skævinge Municipality in 2007. The two municipalities formed a new Hillerød Municipality, where Hækkerup sat in the municipal council until 2007. Hækkerup was the mayor of the former Hillerød Municipality from 2000 to 2006 and of the new Hillerød Municipality from 2006 to 2007.

Career in national politics
Hækkerup was elected into parliament in the 2007 Danish general election, and was reelected in 2011, 2015 and 2019. He was the Minister of Defense in the Helle Thorning-Schmidt I Cabinet from 3 October 2011 to 9 August 2013 and in that same cabinet, he was Minister of European Affairs from 9 August 2013 to 3 February 2014. He was later appointed Minister of Health in the Helle Thorning-Schmidt II Cabinet from 3 February 2014 to 28 June 2015.

Minister of Justice (2019–2022)
In 2019, Hækkerup was appointed Minister of Justice, in the Frederiksen Cabinet. During his time in office, Denmark in April 2022 signed a general extradition treaty with the United Arab Emirates.

On 1 May 2022, it was announced that Hækkerup would be stepping down as justice minister and as an MP to become director of the danish brewery association, starting on 1 June.

Personal life
Hækkerup is the grandson of Per Hækkerup, who was a minister under Jens Otto Krag and Anker Jørgensen. His uncle Hans Hækkerup was defence minister under Poul Nyrup Rasmussen.

Hækkerup has a PhD from Copenhagen University.

Bibliography
Udvikling i EU siden 1992 på de områder, der er omfattet af de danske forbehold (2001, Dansk Udenrigspolitisk Institut (DUPI))
Controls and Sanctions in the EU law (2001, Djøf Forlag, co-author)
Sandheden Kort – Christiansborg fra A til Å (2018, People's Press, co-author)

References

External links
 

1968 births
Living people
People from Fredensborg Municipality
Danish writers
Government ministers of Denmark
Danish Justice Ministers
Danish Defence Ministers
Danish Health Ministers
Danish municipal councillors
Social Democrats (Denmark) politicians
University of Copenhagen alumni
Members of the Folketing 2007–2011
Members of the Folketing 2011–2015
Members of the Folketing 2015–2019
Members of the Folketing 2019–2022